Scydmoraphes is a genus of beetles belonging to the family Staphylinidae.

Synonym: Atropidus Croissandeau, 1894

Species:
 Scydmoraphes helvolus (Schaum, 1844) 
 Scydmoraphes minutus (Chaudoir, 1845)

References

Staphylinidae
Staphylinidae genera